Giant lizards include:

 El Hierro Giant Lizard
 Giant Horned Lizard
 La Gomera Giant Lizard
 La Palma Giant Lizard
 Roque Chico de Salmor Giant Lizard

Lizards
Animal common name disambiguation pages